The Anyang Korea Ginseng Corporation, or Anyang KGC,  is a professional basketball club in the Korean Basketball League, based at Anyang Arena in the city of Anyang. The club has won three KBL championship titles, in 2011–12, 2016–17, and 2020–21.

History

Pre-KBL era (1992–1997)
Anyang KGC traces its lineage to the amateur basketball team started by Seoul Broadcasting System (SBS) in 1992. It was one of several basketball teams started by corporate companies hoping to take advantage of the "basketball craze" taking place during the early to mid-1990s. Prior to 1997, domestic basketball was an amateur sport and all teams, whether sponsored by a corporate company or a university, participated in the National Basketball Festival (Korean: 농구대잔치) competition. The SBS team lacked the financial resources to attract the era's biggest stars and was mostly overshadowed by the dominance of the Kia, Samsung Electronics and Hyundai Electronics and the college teams from Yonsei University and Korea University. One of the better-known players from this era was Jung Jae-kun.

Anyang SBS Stars (1997–2005)
When domestic basketball turned professional, SBS decided to register its team for the upcoming league. The Anyang SBS Stars would move to Anyang, where the team has been ever since. The Anyang municipal government agreed to invest in building a new sports complex to house the basketball team in addition to the football team (Anyang LG Cheetahs) and ice hockey team (Anyang Halla). However the project would take several years to complete so the Anyang SBS Stars had to play their "home" games elsewhere, even though it had "Anyang" in its name. The team spent its first several years playing at Jamsil Arena (now home to Seoul Samsung Thunders), Uijeongbu Gymnasium (repurposed for volleyball and now home to Uijeongbu KB Insurance Stars) and Daelim University College's gymnasium. Anyang Gymnasium was completed on schedule ahead of the 2000–01 season.

At the end of the 2004–05 season, SBS sold the team to Korea Tobacco & Ginseng Corporation (KT&G). At that time, it was the only basketball team sponsored by a broadcasting company. Taeyoung Group, the parent company of SBS, decided to consolidate its financial resources in the broadcasting sector, hence the sale.

KT&G / KGC era (2005–present)
Under their new sponsors, Anyang KT&G Kites spent the next several seasons in the middle ranks of the league table and changed names several times. Red, the color of KGC's best-known product Cheong Kwan Jang, was adopted as the team color and has been associated with Anyang KGC ever since. In 2010, KT&G opted to transfer ownership and naming rights of its sponsored sports teams to subsidiary Korea Ginseng Corporation (KGC) as company directors felt that the sports teams being associated with a tobacco company would be detrimental to marketing efforts. The team, although keeping the signature red color, went through a rebranding with a new team logo and mascot.

The 2011–12 season was a major milestone for the team as they won their first ever Championship. At that time, Anyang had a relatively young and inexperienced squad, consisting of center Oh Se-keun, forward Yang Hee-jong and guards Kim Tae-sul, Park Chan-hee and Lee Jung-hyun, while their own head coach Lee Sang-beom was only in his third season as a head coach of a KBL team. The team suffered the embarrassment of scoring only 41 points in the January game against eventual regular season champions Wonju Dongbu Promy and setting an all-time record for the lowest score in a league game. Despite the setbacks, Anyang managed to reach the final of the play-offs, where they were up against Dongbu. Pundits and observers had predicted the young squad was no match for a Dongbu team which earned the nickname "Dongbu Mountain Fortress" (Korean: 동부산성) for recording the league's best defensive record. Anyang won four out of six games to lift the Championship trophy for the first time in its history. Oh, Yang, Kim, Park and Lee became collectively known as Insamshinki (Hangul: 인삼신기), a portmanteau of KGC's Korean name Insamgongsa (Hangul: 인삼공사) and Dong Bang Shin Ki (Hangul: 동방신기). The quintet went on to carve out their own decorated careers as the league's top domestic players and establish themselves as the backbone of the national team.

KGC spent the 2013–14 and 2014–15 seasons in the lower half of the league table, failing to qualify for the play-offs on both occasions. The 2011–12 team was soon broken up with the departure of Kim to Jeonju KCC Egis and Park, Lee and Oh each enlisting for mandatory military service one after another. They were dealt another blow when Lee Sang-beom's successor Jun Chang-jin was investigated for allegations of match-fixing during his time at Busan KT Sonicboom. Jun never had the chance to coach the team in a league game as he resigned before the 2015–16 season began. To add to the turmoil, Oh was also investigated in connection with the match-fixing case after it was discovered that he and several college teammates had placed bets with the illegal sports betting site back when they were students. Jun's assistant Kim Seung-gi took over and found himself having to fill the void left by Oh, who was suspended for 20 games, and other key players who were absent due to injury or enlistment.

Team names 
 1992–1997: SBS Basketball Team
 1997–2005: Anyang SBS Stars
 2005–2010: Anyang KT&G Kites
 2010–2011: Anyang Korea Ginseng Corporation
 2011–present: Anyang KGC

Current roster

Enlisted players

Season by season

Honours

Korean Basketball League 
KBL Championship
 Winners: 2011–12, 2016–17, 2020–21
 Runners-up: 2021–22

KBL Regular Season
 Winners: 2016–17
 Runners-up: 1997, 2011–12
 Third place: 2004–05, 2020–21, 2021–22

See also 
Daejeon KGC

References

External links
 Anyang KGC official website
 Asia-Basket.com

 
Basketball teams in South Korea
Basketball teams established in 1992
Korean Basketball League teams
KGC Sports Club
Sport in Gyeonggi Province
Anyang, Gyeonggi
1992 establishments in South Korea